Porterhouse (1951–1971) was an American Champion Thoroughbred racehorse.

Background
Bred by Liz Person and raced under her Llangollen Farm banner, Porterhouse was a son of the Argentine-bred Endeavour who also sired Corn Husker, Prove It and Pretense, three top runners who each won the Santa Anita Handicap. His dam was Red Stamp, a daughter of the U.S. Racing Hall of Fame inductee Bimelech.

Conditioned for racing by Charlie Whittingham, Porterhouse was the forty-year-old trainer's first stakes winner and first Champion.

Racing career
In 1953, Porterhouse won East Coast races including the National Stallion Stakes and the then most important race for his age group, the Belmont Futurity Stakes. Porterhouse also won the 1953 Saratoga Special Stakes but was disqualified and set back to last.

Porterhouse was voted American Champion Two-Year-Old Colt by the Daily Racing Form and the Thoroughbred Racing Association. The rival poll organized by Turf & Sports Digest magazine was topped by Hasty Road.

In 1954, three-year-old Porterhouse had a sub-par year in racing, with his only important win coming in the Old Knickerbocker Handicap. The colt did not run in either of the first two races of the U.S. Triple Crown series and finished ninth in the Belmont Stakes won by High Gun. During the next three years in racing, Porterhouse  returned to his winning ways at racetracks in California. He captured several top events, highlighted by his win over future U.S. Racing Hall of Fame inductee Swaps in the 1956 Californian Stakes and the Hollywood Express Handicap in world record time for five and a half furlongs on dirt at Hollywood Park Racetrack.

Stud career
Retired to stud duty, Porterhouse met with reasonable success, siring several good runners including Coaching Club American Oaks winner, Our Cheri Amour, and multiple stakes winners Isle of Greece, Port Wine, and Farwell Party.

Porterhouse died at age twenty in 1971 and was buried a The Stallion Station in Lexington, Kentucky.

References
 Porterhouse's pedigree and partial racing stats
 October 12, 1953 TIME magazine article on Porterhouse's win in the Belmont Futurity
 Article on Porterhouse winning the Knickerbocker Handicap in the May 22, 1954 issue of  The New Yorker magazine

1951 racehorse births
1971 racehorse deaths
Racehorses bred in Kentucky
Racehorses trained in the United States
American Champion racehorses
Whitney racehorses
Thoroughbred family 1-w